Migneauxia is a genus of beetles in the family Latridiidae, containing the following species:

 Migneauxia atrata Johnson, 2007
 Migneauxia crassiuscula (Aubé, 1850)
 Migneauxia fuscata Johnson, 2007
 Migneauxia grandis Dajoz, 1966
 Migneauxia lederi Reitter, 1875
 Migneauxia mirei Dajoz, 1966
 Migneauxia ottoi Johnson, 2006
 Migneauxia phili Johnson, 2007
 Migneauxia psammeticha (Motschulsky, 1867)
 Migneauxia renaudi Dajoz, 1966
 Migneauxia subdola Johnson, 1977

References

Latridiidae genera